William Andreas Salius Fane de Salis (27 October 1812 – 3 August 1896) was a British businessman, colonialist, and barrister.

Early life
De Salis was the third son of Jerome, 4th Count de Salis-Soglio (d. 1836), by his third wife, Henrietta Foster (d. 1856). Peter, 5th Count de Salis-Soglio was an elder half-brother; Rodolphus (a general) was an elder brother and Henry (a bishop) was his youngest brother.

Born in St. Marylebone, Westminster, and brought up in County Louth he was educated at Eton, Heidelberg University, and Oriel College, Oxford, where he took a fourth-class degree in Classics. He was called to the Bar in 1836; and was at 3 Brick Court, Inner Temple, by 1840. He was appointed a revising barrister for Northamptonshire (1839), Nottingham and East Retford.

Career
Fane de Salis visited Australia in 1842, 1844 and 1848 to pursue business opportunities in the Australian wool and other industries, then rapidly expanding. His younger brother Leopold Fabius Fane de Salis had migrated there in 1840. William became, with John Thacker, a partner in Thacker & Co, Jardine Matheson's affiliated house in Sydney, but resigned from 1 July 1847. By 1848 he owned with Robert Towns a 345-ton barque, the Statesman. This they sold, in March 1854, for $16,500, she having had an accident 'on her passage up to China from Sydney'.

On his return to England, de Salis joined the Grand Junction Canal Company in 1850 and held the following appointments:
 Directorship of the Union Bank of Australia;
 Director of the Australian Agricultural Company (AAco) and its offshoot the Peel River Land and Mineral Co Ltd;
 Director of The Marine and General Mutual Life Assurance Society;
 Director and later chairman of the Peninsular & Oriental Steam Navigation Company. He was a director between 1851–1895 and was elected chairman from 1878 until 1881;
 Deputy-chairman then chairman of the London Chartered Bank of Australia from 1852 to 1874/80.

Personal life
In the early 1850s Fane de Salis lived between the Jerusalem Coffee House; Dawley Lodge (near Hillingdon); 1 Upper Belgrave Street; 24 Wilton Street, and 107 Eaton Square. From the late 1850s he lived at Dawley Court, near Hillingdon, and Harlington, Uxbridge, Middlesex and also at Teffont Manor, Teffont Evias, Wiltshire, the home of his wife Emily Harriet (d 24 July 1896), eldest daughter of John Thomas Mayne, whom he married on 12 March 1859.

Fane de Salis was a Fellow of the Geological Society and of the Royal Geographical Society, JP for Middlesex (1868), and JP for Wiltshire.

With J. D. Allcroft he co-founded the Harlington, Harmondsworth and Cranford Cottage Hospital in 1884. He left Dawley Court to his youngest brother's second son, Cecil Fane De Salis. His wife Emily had died only ten days earlier.

Works
 Reminiscences of Travel in China and India in 1848 (1892; private circulation)
 Introductory Remarks to a Residence in Australia, And To Travels in China And India (a short pamphlet)
 Original Poems with Translations from the German of Schiller (private circulation)

Gallery

References

 Reminiscences of Travel in China and India in 1848, 1892 (private circulation).
 Quadrennial di Fano Saliceorum, volume one, by R. de Salis, London, 2003.
 De Salis Family : English Branch, by Rachel Fane De Salis, Henley-on-Thames, 1934.
 Burke's Irish Family Records, ed. Hugh Montgomery-Massingberd, Burke's Peerage Ltd, London, 1976.
 Der Grafliche Hauser, Band XI [volume 11], Genealogisches Handbuch Des Adels, C. A. Starke Verlag, Limburg an der Lahn, 1983 (pps 331-356).
 Thomas Skinner, The Directory of Directors 1880, London, 1880. (a list of directors of joint stock companies in the UK).

1812 births
1896 deaths
People educated at Eton College
British expatriates in Australia
Alumni of Oriel College, Oxford
People from County Louth
People from Marylebone
Fellows of the Royal Geographical Society
Fellows of the Geological Society of London
William Andrew Salius
English archivists
Lawyers from London
19th-century Irish people
19th-century Anglo-Irish people
19th-century English lawyers
English barristers